</noinclude>

The first city club was founded in 1919 as Unione Sportiva Cavese. It was refounded as Pro Cavese in 1974. In 2012, the club, known as S.S. Cavese 1919 S.r.l. at that time, merged with another local side "U.S.D. Pro Cavese 1394", but retained the "Cavese 1919" brand. The club was most recently in Serie B in 1984.

History

From U.S. Cavese, Pro Cavese to S.S. Cavese 1919 

The team was founded in 1919 as Unione Sportiva Cavese, and played its first match ever against Salernitana, ended in a 3–2 win for the Aquilotti. In 1922 the team merged with Libertas Sporting Club, another local team, in order to build a more competitive side. That same year, the team was admitted to the Prima Divisione (the equivalent of the nowadays' Serie A). After a few years near the bottom of the table, the death of their coach and an economic crisis lead to their demotion in 1925.

After languishing in the lower levels of Italian Football for 10 years, S.S. Cavese was promoted to the Prima Divisione (at that time became the 4th highest division) in 1937. With a new stadium Stadio Francis Palmentieri and star player Virgilio Levratto, the Aquilotti rose to the Serie C . However, in 1948 the club ran into more economic trouble, sending them back into the minor divisions. In 1964 the club played its way to the Serie D despite a 3-point penalty. In 1974, Cavese merged with Pro Salerno, another Serie D team, and renamed itself as Pro Cavese. After the merge, several new clubs were founded and named after "Pro Salerno" a few times. Pro Cavese returned to Serie C in 1977 and took back its original denomination in 1980.

In 1981, Cavese was able to gain its first (and only) promotion to Serie B. The first Serie B season for Cavese ended in a 15th place which allowed the team to avoid relegation. The 1982–83 Serie B season was the top season ever for the Campanian team in its whole history: in fact, Cavese was almost to reach promotion to Serie A, ending the first half of the season in a third placed, which would allow the promotion, and sixth at the end of the season. That championship is remembered especially for the crushing 2–1 victory in San Siro against A.C. Milan. The scorers were Joe Jordan for Milan, and Tivelli and Di Michele for Cavese. However, the next season Cavese relegated to Serie C1, and was not able to reach Serie B anymore. The team was even cancelled from Italian football in 1991, and readmitted in the Eccellenza Campania with the denomination S.S. Cavese 1919.

In the 2000s, Cavese went back to the professional Italian leagues and in the 2005–06 Serie C2 season it was able to win the division and come back to Serie C1. In the 2006–07 Serie C1 season, a third place in the regular season allowed Cavese to play the promotion playoffs: after a 5–2 defeat to Foggia in the first leg, Cavese nearly overturned it in the second leg, winning it 3–1 and being eliminated by a late Foggia goal during injury time.

They defeated Napoli 2–1 in a friendly match in the beginnings of 2009.

Starting from 2010, fans of the club also became the shareholders. Local photographer, Michele Angelo Sica, became the executive director.

In the end of 2010–11 Lega Pro Prima Divisione season (ex-Serie C1), Cavese relegated to Lega Pro Seconda Divisione (ex-Serie C2). But in July 2011, the club did not appeal against the exclusion of the first team from professional football by Co.Vi.So.C.

Sica also made a press release in August 2011, stating the logo and color of the club were used by others without approval. S.S. Cavese 1919 had a team participated in a local league Campionato Regionale di Attività Mista in 2011–12 season.

The membership of "S.S. Cavese 1919 S.r.l." in the Italian Football Federation was finally revoked in June 2016, despite the club already given the name of "Cavese 1919" to the phoenix club circa 2012.

From U.S.D. Pro Cavese 1394 to Cavese 1919
In July 2012, another club, U.S.D. Pro Cavese 1394, homage to one of the previous name, Pro Cavese, signed an agreement with S.S. Cavese 1919 to act as a phoenix club. U.S.D. Pro Cavese 1394 also applied to play in 2012–13 Serie D. Circa 2013–14 season Pro Cavese was renamed to U.S.D. Cavese 1919, and then the current name Cavese 1919 in the late 2010s.

U.S.D. Pro Cavese 1394 was formerly known as A.S.D. Città de la Cava 1394 , based in Cava de' Tirreni in  Campania season. Cava won the national promotion play-offs of that division, but requires to deposit €31,000 for the actual spot in 2012–13 Serie D season. Before 2011, the team was known as Vis Sangiorgio , based in Castel San Giorgio. The club had yet another name A.S.D. Paestum Città dei Templi, based in Paestum frazione, Capaccio-Paestum (not to be confused with S.S. Akragas Città dei Templi), but the club was takeover by businessman from Castel San Giorgio in 2009, and proposed to rename to A.S.D. Città di Castel San Giorgio (not to be confused with other team of the city, such as A.S.D. Castel San Giorgio (registration number 620,901) and A.S.D. Castel San Giorgio Calcio (registration number 620,516)). Paestum was relegated in   season, but repêchage on 31 July 2009. Paestum was known as U.S. Poseidon before 2005–06 season (registration number 61,766), also based in Capaccio-Paestum.

Some fans of the original S.S. Cavese 1919, also founded another phoenix club "S.C.S.D. Cava United F.C." in 2014 (registration number 941,251), stating they are still fans of Cavese, but not agree with the club re-foundation by buying the sports title from other club. Cava United participated in Terza Categoria. While Poseidon, another predecessor of the current "Cavese 1919", was also re-founded as U.S. Poseidon 1958 in Capaccio-Paestum (registration number 620,531). Poseidon reached Promozione Campania in 2014. Another team, Aquilotto Cavese (registration number 934,893), was founded by a fans association Associazione Sogno Cavese in 2011, which also related to 2014 founded Cava United.

In April 2014, U.S.D. Cavese 1919 was penalized 3 points in 2013–14 Serie D season, while the Chairman Salvatore Manna was banned from football for 1 year, for some misconducts. He resigned as the chairman in the same month.

Cavese 1919 promoted back to Serie C in 2018. The club was selected as one of the replacement of the teams that fails to register for 2018–19 Serie C. Cavese reached the finals of the promotion play-offs of 2017–18 Serie D Group H. But even as one of the winners of the play-offs (9 winners from 9 groups in total), it did not guarantee promotion.

Colors and badge
Team colors are blue and white.

Players

Current squad

Club Officials

Board of Directors

 Last updated: 30 October 2020
 Source:Board of directors

Current Technical staff

 Last updated: 30 October 2020
 Source:Technical staff

Notable former players

Honours

Serie D
 Winners (1): 2002–2003

 Supercoppa di Serie C
 Winners: 2006

References

External links
 

 
Football clubs in Italy
Football clubs in Campania
Cava de' Tirreni
Serie B clubs
Serie C clubs
Association football clubs established in 1919
1919 establishments in Italy
Association football clubs established in 2012
2012 establishments in Italy
Phoenix clubs (association football)
Fan-owned football clubs
Serie D clubs